Zhang Shuai was the four-time defending champion but chose not to participate.

Wang Xinyu won the title, defeating Moyuka Uchijima in the final, 6–1, 4–6, 6–3.

Seeds

Draw

Finals

Top half

Bottom half

References

External Links
Main Draw

Ando Securities Open - Singles